Parasyscia is a genus of ants in the subfamily Dorylinae containing approximately 50 described species. The genus is distributed across the Afrotropical, Australasia, Indomalaya, Malagasy, Oceania, and Palearctic bioregions. Parasyscia was described by Emery (1882), moved to a subgenus of Cerapachys by Forel (1892) and finally placed as a junior synonym of Cerapachys by Kempf (1972).  Parasyscia was resurrected as a valid genus by Borowiec (2016) during redescription of the doryline genera.

Species

Parasyscia afer 
Parasyscia aitkenii 
Parasyscia arnoldi 
Parasyscia browni 
Parasyscia bryanti 
Parasyscia centurio 
Parasyscia conservata 
Parasyscia cribrinodis 
Parasyscia desposyne 
Parasyscia dohertyi 
Parasyscia dominula 
Parasyscia faurei 
Parasyscia flavaclavata 
Parasyscia fossulata 
Parasyscia foveolata 
Parasyscia hashimotoi 
Parasyscia imerinensis 
Parasyscia inconspicua 
Parasyscia indica 
Parasyscia kenyensis 
Parasyscia keralensis 
Parasyscia kodecorum 
Parasyscia lamborni 
Parasyscia lindrothi 
Parasyscia luteoviger 
Parasyscia majuscula 
Parasyscia muiri 
Parasyscia natalensis 
Parasyscia nitens 
Parasyscia nitidulus 
Parasyscia opaca 
Parasyscia peringueyi 
Parasyscia piochardi 
Parasyscia polynikes 
Parasyscia reticulata 
Parasyscia rifati 
Parasyscia rufithorax 
Parasyscia salimani 
Parasyscia schoedli 
Parasyscia sculpturata 
Parasyscia seema 
Parasyscia sudanensis 
Parasyscia superata 
Parasyscia sylvicola 
Parasyscia terricola 
Parasyscia valida 
Parasyscia villiersi 
Parasyscia vitiensis 
Parasyscia wighti 
Parasyscia wittmeri 
Parasyscia zimmermani

References

Dorylinae
Ant genera